High Life is a 2018 science fiction horror film directed by Claire Denis, in her English-language debut, and written by Denis and her long-time collaborator Jean-Pol Fargeau. Starring Robert Pattinson and Juliette Binoche, it focuses on a group of criminals sent on a space mission toward a black hole while taking part in scientific experiments.

Physicist and black hole expert Aurélien Barrau was hired as a consultant, and Danish-Icelandic artist Olafur Eliasson designed the film's spacecraft. High Life premiered on 9 September 2018 at the Toronto International Film Festival.

Plot

A group of criminals serving death sentences are sent on a mission in space to extract alternative energy from a black hole. Each prisoner is treated as a guinea pig by Dr. Dibs for her experiments. She is fixated on trying to create a child in space through artificial insemination, but has yet to succeed. Sexual activity between prisoners is prohibited. The ship is equipped with "The Box," a device in a small room that is obsessively used by the crew to masturbate. Dr Dibs administers sedatives to the passengers. Dibs is on the ship because she murdered her own children and husband before attempting suicide. Monte, the only celibate prisoner, rejects Dibs' sexual advances. Monte is serving a life sentence for murdering a friend for killing his dog as a child. Monte's only friend on the ship is Tcherny, who is drawn to the onboard garden because it reminds him of Earth.

Pregnant prisoner Elektra delivers a baby, who dies later before she does as well. The captain, Chandra, develops leukemia from radiation and has a stroke before being euthanized by Dibs. One night, male prisoner Ettore attempts to rape Boyse. Nansen, the pilot, intervenes, but Ettore attacks and overpowers her. Monte arrives, throws Ettore off Boyse, and beats him. When Monte leads Boyse away to be treated, Mink stabs Ettore to death in the hallway. Dibs begins doubling the amount of sedatives each prisoner receives, later sneaking into Monte's cell and raping him while he is sedated. She then injects his semen into Boyse, who produces a healthy child that Dibs dotes on, but Monte is unaware that he is the baby's father.

As the ship approaches the black hole, Nansen prepares to pilot a shuttle around it. Unbeknownst to the other prisoners, Boyse kills Nansen with a shovel and takes her place. The shuttle travels through a molecular cloud that alters its trajectory and causes it to dive into the black hole, where Boyse explodes due to spaghettification, the stretching and horizontal compression of objects into long thin shapes in a very strong non-homogeneous gravitational field. Mink later attacks Dibs and injures her, but is then killed by Monte. Dibs informs Monte that the child is his before ejecting herself into space. Tcherny commits suicide and Monte buries him in the garden according to his wishes. Now the only surviving prisoner, Monte removes the bodies from the ship's morgue, dresses them in spacesuits, and releases them into space.

Monte struggles to raise the baby, whom he has named Willow. He attempts to make repairs to the ship, but her frantic cries through his helmet speakers causes him to drop a tool and lose it in space. Much later, when Willow has grown into a teenager, they encounter another ship similar to their own. Monte boards the ship, but finds it carrying stray dogs who have survived by eating one another. Willow begs Monte to bring one back, but he refuses, implying contamination could potentially sicken or kill them. The ship moves closer to the black hole, and Willow convinces Monte to board a shuttle with her and execute the Penrose process that, if successful, is supposed to slingshot them away from the black hole. No longer wearing space suits, Monte takes Willow's hand, and they walk together to a yellow light source that grows ever larger and envelops them.

Cast

Production
Claire Denis had the idea of the project in her mind for fifteen years. She said, "I had a screenplay which was naturally in English, because the story takes place in space and, I don't know why, but for me, people speak English—or Russian or Chinese—but definitely not French in space."

Novelist Nick Laird co-wrote the screenplay for the film along with Denis, Fargeau and Geoff Cox. Laird's wife Zadie Smith also contributed to early drafts of the English version of the screenplay. Due to creative differences between Denis and Smith, Laird and Smith dropped out of the project as screenwriters, but Laird later served as the consultant for the script.

Denis went to the European Space Agency's Astronaut Centre in Cologne to learn about human spaceflight exploration before the film started shooting.

Denis explained the practical reasons for the non-linear story, saying "I always wanted it to start with a man and a baby, as a ritual of two living persons with no despair in that moment. And then there would be the flashbacks bringing in all the despair." Denis compared Pattinson's character to the knight Percival of Arthurian legend, and Binoche's character to Medea from the Greek tragedy.

Casting
During the project's early stages, Denis had Vincent Gallo in mind for the lead role, and wrote the film thinking of Philip Seymour Hoffman. The project later caught the attention of Robert Pattinson; according to Denis:Pattinson contacted the person who was doing the English casting. I was intrigued but I thought he was too young. Every time I went to London to meet some actors, he was there. His desire to work with me has never faltered. And now he is a little less young and it's perfect. […] It's strange, though, because it would be difficult to imagine anyone more unlike Philip Seymour Hoffman physically, but Robert is very enigmatic, with a powerful presence. He gives off an aura that immediately makes you want to film him.Pattinson described his character as an astronaut and said, "He's a criminal who volunteers for a mission toward a black hole, but he realizes along the way that a doctor on board also wants to do sexual experimentation with humans in space." In late 2015, Patricia Arquette and Mia Goth joined the cast. In September 2017, Arquette dropped out while the rest of the cast, including Juliette Binoche and rapper André 3000, were also announced. Playing the role of baby Willow is Scarlette Lindsay, Pattinson's goddaughter. After Pattinson was unable to bond with the babies cast as Willow, he remembered that Lindsay was friendly around adults. Pattinson asked a favour of Lindsay's father to cast her in the film, which he described as a "massive gamble" that was ultimately paid off by her "incredible" performance.

Filming
Principal photography began in Cologne, Germany on 4 September 2017. The Polish part of the shooting took place in Białystok. Filming wrapped in late October 2017.

Release

Following its world premiere at the Toronto International Film Festival, the film competed in main competition at the San Sebastián International Film Festival in late September 2018. The film had its theatrical release in France on 7 November 2018 and in the United Kingdom on 10 May 2019. A24 acquired U.S. distribution rights to the film. The film was released in the United States on 5 April 2019. It was later given a Blu-Ray/DVD release in North American retailers.

Reception

Critical response
The website's critics consensus reads, "High Life is as visually arresting as it is challenging, confounding, and ultimately rewarding – which is to say it's everything film fans expect from director Claire Denis." On Metacritic, the film has a weighted average score of 77 out of 100 based on reviews from 42 critics, indicating "generally favorable reviews".

David Ehrlich of IndieWire gave the film an A− grade, saying it owed more to Solaris than Star Wars and describing it as "a pensive and profound study of human life on the brink of the apocalypse." Jessica Kiang of Variety called it "extraordinary, difficult, hypnotic, and repulsive". Charles Bramesco of the Guardian gave the film 5 stars out of 5, saying Denis had reconfigured the genre's "familiar components to create a startlingly fresh engagement with the question of what it means to be human." Steve MacFarlane of Slant Magazine wrote: "The film asks down-and-dirty questions about what really resides beneath thousands of years of human progress, a savage and haunting antidote to the high-minded idealism of movies like Christopher Nolan's Interstellar and Ridley Scott's The Martian." Matt Zoller Seitz of RogerEbert.com described it as "tailor-made for viewers who like science fiction in a cryptic 1970s art-house mode."

In France, Le Monde and Libération described High Life as a "masterpiece".

Accolades

Notes

References

External links
 
 

2018 films
2010s English-language films
2010s science fiction horror films
A24 (company) films
American science fiction horror films
British science fiction horror films
British drama films
Films about rape
Films directed by Claire Denis
Films shot in Cologne
Films set on spacecraft
French drama films
2010s pregnancy films
French science fiction horror films
English-language French films
German drama films
English-language German films
German science fiction horror films
Mad scientist films
Polish drama films
English-language Polish films
Polish science fiction films
British pregnancy films
French pregnancy films
German pregnancy films
2010s American films
2010s British films
2010s French films
2010s German films